Eta Sagittae (η Sagittae) is solitary star in the northern constellation of Sagitta. It is faintly visible to the naked eye, having an apparent visual magnitude of +5.09. There is a 61.1% chance that it is a member of the Hyades-Pleiades stream of stars that share a common motion through space.

This is an evolved K-type giant star with a stellar classification of K2 III. At the age of about 1.7 billion years, it is now a red clump star that is generating energy through the fusion of helium at its core. Eta Sagittae has 1.7 times the mass of the Sun and has expanded to seven times the Sun's radius.

References

K-type giants
Horizontal-branch stars
Sagittae, Eta
Sagitta (constellation)
Sagittae, 16
Durchmusterung objects
190608
098920
7679